"Sub-Rosa Subway" is a song written by the Canadian rock band Klaatu, from their album 3:47 EST, describing the efforts of Alfred Ely Beach to create the Beach Pneumatic Transit, the New York City Subway's precursor. His work is described as secretive (hence sub rosa). The song peaked at No. 62 on the Billboard Hot 100 chart in 1977.

The song is best known for sparking the rumour that the band was the Beatles in disguise.

Two minutes and fifty seconds into the song, a long message in Morse code plays in the background. John Woloschuk, in an article in the fan magazine The Morning Sun, finally provided a translation of the code:

"From Alfred, heed thy sharpened ear — A message we do bring — Starship appears upon our sphere — Through London's sky come spring." 

The harpsichord sound on the song was created by recording a tack piano with the tape recorder running at half-normal speed.

Charts

Personnel
Album version
John Woloschuk - lead vocals, backing vocals, keyboards, bass guitar, percussion
Dee Long - backing vocals, electric guitar, synthesizer, telegraphy
Terry Draper - drums
Vern Dorge - chimes

Single version
John Woloschuk - lead vocals, keyboards, bass guitar, maracas, bongos
Dee Long - electric guitar, synthesizer, telegraphy

References

External links
 Klaatu's official website
 "Sub-Rosa Subway" lyrics
 "Klaatu Identities and Beatles Rumors"

Klaatu (band) songs
1976 songs
Baroque pop songs
Capitol Records singles
Song recordings produced by Terry Brown (record producer)
Songs about New York City
Songs about trains